The 2023 Judo World Masters will be held in Budapest, Hungary, from 4 to 6 August 2023 as part of the IJF World Tour and during the 2024 Summer Olympics qualification period.

References

External links
 

World Masters
IJF World Masters
World Masters
Masters 2023
Judo
Judo World Masters
Judo
Judo World Masters